Bela Juhasz (1906 – 1967) was a Yugoslav wrestler. He competed in the men's Greco-Roman light heavyweight at the 1928 Summer Olympics.

References

External links
 

1906 births
1967 deaths
Yugoslav male sport wrestlers
Olympic wrestlers of Yugoslavia
Wrestlers at the 1928 Summer Olympics
Place of birth missing